Gandhakasala rice is a variety of rice cultivated by the farmers in Wayanad District in Kerala. As of 2010, gandhkasala is cultivated in an area of  327 hectares and jeerakasala in 22 hectares. 

Gandhakasala is one of two varieties of scented rice cultivated in Wayanad the other one being Jeerakasala rice. Both varieties have been identified as having potential to compete with the well known varieties of scented rice like basmati rice and jasmine rice. 

Because of the disease-resistant properties, high nutritional value, fine taste and cooking properties, this variety of rice is traditionally used in special occasions like wedding feasts.

Characterization

MS Swaminathan Research Foundation (MSSRF) has characterized this variety of rice in terms of descriptors developed by National Bureau of Plant Genetic Resources (NBPGR) and International  Plant Genetic Resources Institute (IPGRI). More than 40 descriptors have been  used in this characterization. The Community Agrobiodiversity Center in Kalpetta, Wayanad, established by MSSRF has actively been involved in efforts to conserve these specialty varieties of rice since 1997.

Certification as Farmers' Varieties

The paddy seeds of gandhakasala, along with jeerakasala and four more varieties, were given certification as Farmers’ Varieties under the provisions of the Protection of Plant Varieties and Farmers’ Rights Authority, Ministry of Agriculture, Government of India. This was made possible due to the efforts of SEED CARE, an association of traditional paddy cultivators of Wayanad, under the guidance of MSSRF’s Community Agro-biodiversity Centre. 

Nationally, this certification has been given to 545 varieties so far, but the Wayanad rice varieties are unique as certification is under the category of that given to a "farming community".

Geographical Indication registration

Both jeerakasala and gandhakasala rice have been registered with the Geographical Indications (GI) registry of Government of India in 2010. This was due to the joint efforts of Kerala Agricultural University and  Wayanad Zilla Nellulpadaka Karshaka Samithi. It was the agro-ecological conditions, the methods of  organic cultivation, traditional genetic makeup of cultivars, and unique processing technologies that has produced the specific aroma and flavour of jeerakasala and gandhakasala rice varieties.

References

Geographical indications in Kerala
Rice
Culture of Wayanad district